Morris Berman (born August 3, 1944) is an American historian and social critic. He earned a BA in mathematics at Cornell University in 1966 and a PhD in the history of science at Johns Hopkins University in 1971. Berman is an academic humanist cultural critic who specializes in Western cultural and intellectual history.

Life and work 
Berman has served on the faculties of a number of universities in the U.S., Canada, and Europe. Berman emigrated from the U.S. to Mexico in 2006, where he was a visiting professor at the Tecnologico de Monterrey in Mexico City from 2008 to 2009. During this period he continued writing for various publications including Parteaguas, a quarterly magazine.

Although an academic, Berman has written several books for a general audience. They deal with the state of Western civilization and with an ethical, historically responsible, or enlightened approach to living within it. His work emphasizes the legacies of the European Enlightenment and the historical place of present-day American culture.

He wrote a trilogy on consciousness and spirituality, published between 1981 and 2000, and another trilogy on the American decline, published between 2000 and 2011. Book reviewer George Scialabba commented:

Recognition 
In 1990, Berman received the Governor's Writers Award (Washington State) for his book Coming to Our Senses. In 1992, he was the recipient of the first annual Rollo May Center Grant for Humanistic Studies. In 2000, Berman's book The Twilight of American Culture was named one of the ten most recommended books of the year by the Christian Science Monitor and was named a "Notable Book" by The New York Times. In 2013 he received the "Neil Postman Award for Career Achievement in Public Intellectual Activity" from the Media Ecology Association. Berman moved to Mexico in 2006 where he continues to reside .

Selected works 
  – nonfiction
  – nonfiction
  – nonfiction
  – nonfiction
  – nonfiction
  – nonfiction
  – essay collection – nonfiction
  – fiction (a collection of three novellas)
  – poetry
  – nonfiction
  – a philosophical memoir – nonfiction
  – nonfiction 
  – fiction (a novel)
  – essay collection – nonfiction
  – nonfiction
  – fiction (short story collection)
  – nonfiction

References

External links 
 Berman's weblog
 Berman's Curriculum Vitae (RTF)
 Why America Failed interview on Media Matters with Bob McChesney (4 Dec 2011)
 Dark Ages America interview on Media Matters with Bob McChesney (30 July 2006)
 Dark Ages America: The Final Phase of Empire on C-SPAN Book TV (19 May 2006)
 Two short videos of an interview with Morris Berman On the Decline of Empire: 'Why America Failed', on Conversations with great minds
Why The American Empire Was Destined To Collapse — Nomi Prins Interviews Morris Berman
Waiting for the barbarians – essay first published in The Guardian, Friday 5 October 2001

1944 births
Academic staff of the Monterrey Institute of Technology and Higher Education
American essayists
American humanists
Cornell University alumni
Johns Hopkins University alumni
Living people
North American cultural studies
Catholic University of America faculty